Diego Martín Alonso López (born 16 April 1975) is a Uruguayan professional football head coach and former player who played as a striker.

Other than in his own country, he played football in Argentina, Spain, Mexico and China in a 16-year career, notably winning the 2001–02 Segunda División with Atlético Madrid while being crowned top scorer. He represented Uruguay at the 1999 Copa América.

Alonso began working as a coach in 2011, being in charge of clubs in Uruguay, Paraguay, Mexico and the United States and leading Pachuca to the 2016 Clausura and the 2016–17 CONCACAF Champions League titles. In December 2021, he was appointed at the Uruguay national side.

Playing career

Club
Alonso was born in Montevideo, the country's capital. He made his professional debut with C.A. Bella Vista where he remained four seasons, helping the side to the second division title in 1997.

After a brief spell in Argentina for Club de Gimnasia y Esgrima La Plata (he would also represent the club towards the end of his career), Alonso moved to Spain, where he played with five teams in as many years: Valencia CF, Atlético Madrid (where he scored 22 goals in 2001–02's second division, helping the Colchoneros return to La Liga and forming an efficient attacking partnership with countryman Fernando Correa, who added 13), Racing de Santander, Málaga CF and Real Murcia, where he did not have a good scoring record overall. In between his fourth and fifth club, he played one year in Mexico with Club Universidad Nacional.

In 2006, the 31-year-old Alonso returned to his country and joined hometown's Club Nacional de Football. However, shortly after, he moved abroad again, signing with Shanghai Shenhua F.C. in the Chinese Super League; after two seasons with Gimnasia, the veteran switched to Peñarol.

International
Alonso made seven appearances for the Uruguay national team in two years. His debut came on 17 June 1999 in a 3–2 friendly win over Paraguay, in Ciudad del Este.

Alonso was chosen for the nation's squad for that year's Copa América, and scored on his quarter-final penalty shootout attempt (5–3 victory) for the eventual runners-up, also against Paraguay, the hosts. In spite of his season with Atlético he was not selected for the 2002 FIFA World Cup, and subsequently criticised manager Víctor Púa.

Coaching career
Alonso started working as a manager in 2011, being in charge in quick succession of Bella Vista, Club Guaraní, Peñarol and Club Olimpia (the second and fourth sides from the Paraguayan Primera División). In December 2014, he was appointed at C.F. Pachuca of the Mexican Liga MX, leading them to the 2016 Clausura and the subsequent edition of the CONCACAF Champions League. On 4 May 2018, he was released.

On 2 June 2018, Alonso was named coach of C.F. Monterrey. In May of the following year, after the 2–1 aggregate victory over Tigres UANL in the Champions League final, he became the first manager to win the competition with two different clubs. On 30 September 2019, following a 0–2 loss to the same opposition that left his team in 12th place on the general table, he was dismissed.

On 30 December 2019, Alonso was announced as the inaugural head coach of Major League Soccer side Inter Miami CF. On 7 January 2021, he left by mutual consent.

Alonso was appointed manager of Uruguay on 14 December 2021, replacing Óscar Tabárez who had occupied the position for the previous 15 years. On 24 March 2022, after four wins in his first four games in charge, he secured qualification for the World Cup in Qatar. In December, after failing to progress from the group stage in the finals, he presented his resignation and cited his desire to return to club duties.

Personal life
Alonso is a cousin of Iván Alonso, who also played several years in Spain, mainly with Deportivo Alavés.

Managerial statistics

Honours

Player

Club
Bella Vista
Uruguayan Segunda División: 1997

Atlético Madrid
Segunda División: 2001–02

UNAM
Liga MX: Apertura 2004
Campeón de Campeones: 2004

Shanghai
A3 Champions Cup: 2007

Peñarol
Uruguayan Primera División: 2009–10
Copa Libertadores runner-up: 2011

International
Uruguay
Copa América runner-up: 1999

Individual
Pichichi Trophy (Segunda División): 2001–02

Manager
Pachuca
Liga MX: Clausura 2016
CONCACAF Champions League: 2016–17
Copa MX runner–up: Apertura 2017
FIFA Club World Cup third place: 2017

Monterrey
CONCACAF Champions League: 2019

Individual
CONCACAF Champions League Team of the Tournament: 2019

References

External links

National team data 

1975 births
Living people
Uruguayan footballers
Footballers from Montevideo
Association football forwards
Uruguayan Primera División players
Uruguayan Segunda División players
C.A. Bella Vista players
Club Nacional de Football players
Peñarol players
Argentine Primera División players
Club de Gimnasia y Esgrima La Plata footballers
La Liga players
Segunda División players
Valencia CF players
Atlético Madrid footballers
Racing de Santander players
Málaga CF players
Real Murcia players
Liga MX players
Club Universidad Nacional footballers
Chinese Super League players
Shanghai Shenhua F.C. players
Uruguay international footballers
1999 Copa América players
Uruguayan expatriate footballers
Expatriate footballers in Argentina
Expatriate footballers in Spain
Expatriate footballers in Mexico
Expatriate footballers in China
Uruguayan expatriate sportspeople in Argentina
Uruguayan expatriate sportspeople in Spain
Uruguayan expatriate sportspeople in Mexico
Uruguayan expatriate sportspeople in China
Uruguayan football managers
Uruguayan Primera División managers
C.A. Bella Vista managers
Peñarol managers
Paraguayan Primera División managers
Club Guaraní managers
Club Olimpia managers
Liga MX managers
C.F. Pachuca managers
C.F. Monterrey managers
Major League Soccer coaches
Inter Miami CF coaches
Uruguay national football team managers
2022 FIFA World Cup managers
Uruguayan expatriate football managers
Expatriate football managers in Paraguay
Expatriate football managers in Mexico
Expatriate soccer managers in the United States
Uruguayan expatriate sportspeople in Paraguay
Uruguayan expatriate sportspeople in the United States